Kreševljaković is a surname. Notable people with the surname include:

 Hamdija Kreševljaković (1888-1959), Bosnian historian
 Muhamed Kreševljaković (1939-2001), Bosnian politician
 Nihad Kreševljaković (1977), Bosnian historian

Bosnian surnames